Meirás Club de Fútbol is a football team based in Valdoviño, A Coruña, in the autonomous community of Galicia. Founded in 1973, it currently plays in Segunda Autonómica – Group 1 (regional leagues). The side's stadium is Misael Prieto, with the capacity of 2,000 spectators (all seated).

Season to season

3 seasons in Tercera División

External links
Futbolme.com profile
senafutbolmarin.blogspot.com.es profile

Football clubs in Galicia (Spain)
Divisiones Regionales de Fútbol clubs
Association football clubs established in 1973
1973 establishments in Spain